Hector Grant (22 June 1924 – 3 September 1998) was an Australian cricketer. He played in two first-class matches for South Australia in 1956/57.

See also
 List of South Australian representative cricketers

References

External links
 

1924 births
1998 deaths
Australian cricketers
South Australia cricketers
Cricketers from Adelaide